was a Japanese ornithologist. His works included Birds of the Island of Java (2 Volumes, 1933–36) and Parrots of the World in Life Colours (1975). He described the crested shelduck in 1917.

He also worked on the distinction between the auks and petrels and the special characteristics of shearwaters that foraged underwater.

Family
Father: Kuroda Nagashige (1867–1939)
Mother: Shimazu Kiyoko
Wife: Princess Kan'in Shigeko (1897–1991)
Children (all by Kan’in Shigeko):
Kuroda Nagahisa (1916–2009)
Masako married Maeda Toshitatsu
Mitsuko married Yamauchi Toyoaki
Shizuko married Mitsuo Mansho (1927–2018)

List of books available in English
Birds of the Island of Java  (1933)
Passeres  (1933)
A bibliography of the duck tribe, Anatidae, mostly from 1926 to 1940, exclusive of that of Dr. Phillips's work (1942)

References

 

Japanese ornithologists
Japanese mammalogists
20th-century Japanese zoologists
1889 births
1978 deaths